George William Baird (December 13, 1839 – November 26, 1906) was a US Army officer who received the Medal of Honor for his actions during the Indian Wars.

Early life 
Baird was born on December 13, 1839, in Milford, Connecticut. He graduated from Hopkins Grammar School in 1859, and later entered Yale University. Despite leaving Yale prior to graduation to fight in the American Civil War, he would receive his diploma in 1863.

Military career 

Baird joined the 1st Connecticut Light Artillery Battery in August 1862, and served with the unit until March 1864, when he was appointed colonel of volunteers of the 32nd United States Colored Infantry. He mustered out with his regiment in August 1865, and was appointed as a second lieutenant of the 19th Infantry Regiment in May 1866. From 1871 to 1879, he served as adjutant of the 5th Infantry Regiment, commanded by Nelson A. Miles (Baird later wrote the book General Miles's Indian Campaigns: On the Staked Plains.), and served under him in the Nez Perce War. He became deputy paymaster general with the rank of lieutenant colonel in July 1899. Baird was eventually promoted to brigadier general on February 19, 1903, the day before his retirement.

Death 
Baird died on November 26, 1906, in Asheville, North Carolina, and was buried in his hometown of Milford, Connecticut.

Medal of Honor citation 
Rank and organization: First Lieutenant, 5th U.S. Infantry. Place and date: At Bear Paw Mountains, Mont., September 30, 1877. Entered service at: Milford, Conn. Birth: Milford, Conn. Date of issue: November 27, 1894.

Citation
Most distinguished gallantry in action with the Nez Perce Indians.

References 

1839 births
1906 deaths
United States Army Medal of Honor recipients
Union Army colonels
United States Army generals
American Indian Wars recipients of the Medal of Honor
Military personnel from Connecticut
United States Army paymasters
People from Milford, Connecticut
Yale University alumni
Hopkins School alumni